My Life in Heavy Metal is a short story collection by Steve Almond published in 2002 by Grove Press. The bulk of the stories are about young men, in their twenties exploring their lives.

Stories
 My Life in Heavy Metal - the sexual exploits of a rock critic who attends a Metallica concert at which "the bassist introduces himself by farting into his microphone"
 Among the Ik - a widowed anthropology professor remembers a dead student
 Geek Player, Love Slayer
 The Last Single Days of Don Victor Potapenko - the comical adventures of an aging lothario
 Run Away, My Pale Love
 The Law of Sugar
 The Pass
 Moscow
 Valentino - Iowa teenage boys talk about beauty and love
 How to Love a Republican
 Pornography
 The Body in Extremis

Critical response
The Guardian found a mix of "hip social satire" and sentiment, calling it "perverse, poetic, odd". Ann Bauer was less pleased with its uneven combination of "sappy poetry" and "bold narrative prose".  Patrick Sullivan found an "easy authenticity" in the tales.

Previous publications

The stories were previously published separately in the following magazines:

My Life in Heavy Metal, and How to Love a Republican, were published in Playboy.
Among the Ik, was published in Zoetrope: All Story.
Greek Player, Love Slayer, was published in the Missouri Review.
The Last Single Days of Don Victor Potapenko, was published in Another Chicago Magazine.
Run Away, My Pale Love, was published in Ploughshares.
The Law of Sugar, was published in The Denver Quarterly.
The Pass, was published in the New England Review.
Moscow, was published in the North American Review.
Valentino, was published in Other Voices.
Pornography, was published in Boulevard.
The Body in Extremis, was published in the Anthology the Ex-Files.

References

External links
 Publisher Grove Atlantic's page

American short story collections
2002 short story collections